The Rooppur Nuclear Power Plant 
() will be a 2.4 GWe nuclear power plant in Bangladesh. It will be the country's first nuclear power plant, and the first of the two units is expected to go into operation in 2024. The VVER-1200/523 Nuclear reactor and critical infrastructures are being built by the Russian Rosatom State Atomic Energy Corporation. In the main construction period, the total number of employees will reach 12,500, including 2,500 specialists from Russia. It is expected to generate around 15% of the country's electricity when completed.

History

Planning 

The plan to establish a nuclear power plant in the then East Pakistan was made in 1961. The plan was to establish a 200MW nuclear power plant in the selected site. Discussions took place with the Government of Canada from 1964 to 1966. Discussions with the governments of Sweden and Norway were also going on in those years. However, no real progress was made. In 1970, the project was scrapped.

After the independence of Bangladesh, the Government of Bangladesh started discussion with the Soviet Union in 1974, but no agreement was reached. In 1976–77, the French company Sofratom conducted a feasibility study and found the project at Rooppur feasible. In 1980, a 125 MW nuclear power plant project was approved. However, this effort also did not materialize. In the 1987-88 period, another feasibility study was conducted and the decision was taken to construct a 300 to 500 MW nuclear power plant. In 1998, steps were taken to construct a 600 MW power plant. The nuclear action plan was approved in 2000.

In 2005, Bangladesh signed a nuclear cooperation agreement with China. In 2007, the Bangladesh Atomic Energy Commission (BAEC) proposed two 500 MW nuclear reactors for Rooppur by 2015. In 2008, China offered funding for the project. Instead, the Bangladesh government started discussion with the Russian government a year later and on 13 February the two governments signed a memorandum of understanding. Rosatom said they would start construction by 2013.

In 2011, International Atomic Energy Agency conducted IAEA Integrated Nuclear Infrastructure Review (INIR) mission in Bangladesh. Later on, IAEA approved a technical assistance project for the Rooppur nuclear power plant. In 2013 a group of Bangladeshi scientists and the global diaspora voiced profound concern over the safety and economic viability of the plant. Several separate issues were raised, from the unsuitability of the site to the obsolescence of the VVER-1000 model proposed, questionable financing arrangements and a lack of agreement with Russia over nuclear waste disposal.

In 2015, the proposal was delayed by a year. Rosatom offered a two VVER-1200 reactor power plant, increasing output to 2.4 GWe. On December 25, 2015, representatives of the Bangladesh Atomic Energy Commission and the Russian state nuclear corporation Rosatom signed the contract for the construction of the Rooppur nuclear power plant worth the equivalent of US$12.65 billion. Three days later, The Daily Star echoed criticism from Germany-based Transparency International about increased costs, from statements of around US$4 billion made earlier in the same year. Transparency International also expressed concern about the safety of the proposed plant.

Construction 
In 2016 ground preparation work commenced.  The $12.65 billion contract is 90% funded by a loan from the Russian government. The two units generating 2.4 GWe are planned to be operational in 2024 and 2025. Rosatom will operate the units for the first year before handing over to Bangladeshi operators. Russia will supply the nuclear fuel and take back spent nuclear fuel.

On 4 November 2017, Bangladesh Atomic Energy Commission received, from Bangladesh Atomic Energy Regulatory Authority, the design and construction license of Unit 1, paving the way for the nuclear island first concrete pour.

The nuclear reactor and critical infrastructure are being built by Russian companies. Atomenergomash is the engineering division of Russia's state nuclear corporation, Rosatom. This company is the supplier of all the equipment for the reactor compartment of Rooppur Nuclear Power Plant and a significant part of the equipment for the machine room. Over 70 tenders have been issued for ‘non-critical’ works where Bangladeshi and Indian construction companies can participate.

On 14 July 2018, the first concrete was poured for Unit 2. The following month, Rosatom began installing a 200-tonne core catcher as the first large piece of equipment in the reactor building of Rooppur 1, describing it as "a unique protection system".

When the COVID-19 pandemic struck Bangladesh in early 2020, many projects such as the Dhaka Metro Rail were stalled, but the Rooppur Nuclear Power Plant remained on track to be completed by 2023. Progress in this period includes Rosatom's engineering company Atommash completing hydraulic tests for Rooppur unit 1.

Safety 
VVER-1200/523 is one of the latest Generation III+ nuclear reactor. Design feature of the nuclear reactor is layered safety barriers preventing escape of radioactive material. The reactor has five layers:

 Fuel pellets: Radioactive elements are retained within the crystal structure of the fuel pellets.
 Fuel rods: The zircaloy tubes provide a further barrier resistant to heat and high pressure.
 Reactor shell: a massive steel shell encases the whole fuel assembly hermetically.
 Core catcher: A core catcher is a device provided to catch the molten core material (corium) of a nuclear reactor in case of a nuclear meltdown and prevent it from escaping the containment building.
 Reactor building: A concrete containment building is the last line of defence. It prevents escape of radiation. It also protects from external damages.

The nuclear part of the plant is housed in a single building acting as containment and missile shield. Besides the reactor and steam generators this includes an improved refueling machine, and the computerized reactor control systems. Likewise protected in the same building are the emergency systems, including an emergency core cooling system, emergency backup diesel power supply, and backup feed water supply. A passive heat removal system had been added to the  VVER-1200. The system is based on a cooling system and water tanks built on top of the containment dome. The passive systems handle all safety functions for 24 hours, and core safety for 72 hours.

Other new safety systems include aircraft crash protection, hydrogen recombiners, and a core catcher to contain the molten reactor core in the event of a severe accident. Russia's arms manufacturer Almaz-Antey to install cooling systems for Rooppur Nuclear Power Plant.

Economics
The US$12.65 billion project will be constructed with Russian loan amounting US$11.38 billion and the rest will be financed by the Bangladesh government.

With over 90% utilization factor, the power plant is expected to generate 19 billion kWh annually. Levelized Cost of Electricity(LCOE) is 56.73 (USD/MWh)

Planned nuclear power reactors

Research 
Bangladesh's development strategy sees the country becoming a middle-income nation by 2021, in large part by emphasis on its science and technology sector to drive economic growth. The ministry of science and technology (MoST) estimated in 2014 that US$6.2 billion will be needed in the next decade to achieve the goals of Vision 2021. The Science and Technology Act 2010 is helping to boost this, and MoST is now allocating over $150 million per year to nuclear technology development as gas reserves become depleted. The power plant will also promote the local economy of Rooppur, Pabna.

The country has had a TRIGA 3 MW research reactor operational since 1986.

Controversy

See also

 Rooppur pillow scandal
 Nuclear energy in Bangladesh
 Kaptai dam
 Mymensingh Power Station
 Matarbari Power Plant
 Payra Power Plant
 Raozan Power Plant
 Rampal Power Station
 List of megaprojects in Bangladesh

References

Nuclear power in Bangladesh
Nuclear power stations with reactors under construction
Proposed power stations in Bangladesh